Kitty was a merchantman built at Sunderland in 1787. In 1790 she carried slaves from the Gold Coast to Jamaica. Then in 1791 she transported convicts and goods from England to Australia. She was last listed in 1805.

Career

Slave voyage (1789–1790)
In 1790 Kitty was under the command of Captain James Glynn. Captain Glynn sailed from London on 15 November 1789 and arrived in Africa on 12 January 1790. Kitty acquired her slaves at Cape Coast Castle and sailed from Africa on 8 March. She arrived at Morant Bay, Jamaica in May 1790 with 113 slaves.

Convict voyage
Lloyd's Register for 1792 shows the ownership of Kitty changing to Christopher & Co., and her master from Glynn to G. Ramsey.

Under the command of George Ramsay she sailed from England, on 31 March 1791, with 10 male and 30 female convicts and a cargo of stores. Kitty sprung a leak shortly after departure and returned to Spithead for repairs. There eight male convicts escaped. She left Portsmouth on 6 April 1792. Further repairs were undertaken at Rio de Janeiro and Cape Town before she arrived at Port Jackson, New South Wales, on 18 November 1792. Three female convicts died during the voyage. Daniel Woodriff was Naval Agent for the voyage. Kitty also brought out 282,567 lbs. of flour, 165,360 lbs. of pork, and 126,000 lbs. of beef for the colony.

Woodriff reported that homeward-bound, Kitty left Port Jackson on 4 June 1793, having taken a cargo to Norfolk Island in the interim. She sailed via Cape Horn, St Catherine's, and Rio de Janeiro, before arriving at the Cove of Cork on 5 February 1794.

Merchantman
On her return from Port Jackson, Kitty became a merchantman. In 1795 Ramsey was still her master, and she was listed as being at Cork.

In 1800 Kittys trade was London transport, and her master was A. Sterling. This entry continues to 1805, which is the last listing for her. The last listing for Kitty in the Register of Shipping is in 1800 and concurs with the listing in Lloyd's Register.

Citations and references
Citations

References
 
 

1787 ships
Ships built on the River Wear
London slave ships
Convict ships to New South Wales
Age of Sail merchant ships
Merchant ships of the United Kingdom